is a passenger railway station in located in the city of Shingū, Wakayama Prefecture, Japan, operated by West Japan Railway Company (JR West).

Lines

Station layout
The station consists of a single island platform connected to the station building by a level crossing. The station is unattended.

Platforms

Adjacent stations

|-
!colspan=5|West Japan Railway Company (JR West)

History
The Shingu Railway was nationalized on July 1, 1934, and the station was renamed . It was renamed again to its present name on April 1, 1942. In August 1945, the Tomoegawa Paper Mill Shingu Factory began operation, with a freight spur line to this station. With the privatization of the Japan National Railways (JNR( on April 1, 1987, the station came under the aegis of the West Japan Railway Company (JR West) and the Japan Freight Railway Company (JR Freight). Freight operations were terminated from March 16, 1996.

Passenger statistics
In fiscal 2019, the station was used by an average of 229 passengers daily (boarding passengers only).

Surrounding Area
 
Wakayama Prefectural Shinsho High School
Sano River

See also
List of railway stations in Japan

References

External links

 Kii-Sano Station (West Japan Railway) 

Railway stations in Wakayama Prefecture
Railway stations in Japan opened in 1913
Shingū, Wakayama